Ben Stevenson may refer to:

 Ben Stevenson (dancer) (born 1936), English ballet dancer and artistic director
 Ben Stevenson (footballer) (born 1997), English footballer, for Forest Green Rovers
 Ben Stevenson (American football) (1906–1969), American football player
 Ben Stevenson (rugby union) (born 1998), English Rugby Union player
 Ben Stevenson (water polo) (born 1995), American water polo player

See also
 Benjamin Stephenson (disambiguation)